Julieta Ortega (born 6 October 1972) is an Argentine actress. She is the daughter of Palito Ortega and Evangelina Salazar and sister of Martín Ortega, Sebastián Ortega, Emanuel Ortega and Luis Ortega.

Biography 
Palito Ortega and Evangelina Salazar got married in 1967. The wedding was broadcast on television. They had six children, Martín Ortega Salazar, Julieta Ortega, Sebastián Ortega, Emanuel Ortega, Luis Ortega and Rosario Ortega Salazar. In 1985 the entire family moved to Miami, Florida to return only when Palito ran for governor of Tucumán. In 1981, when she was only 9 years old, she went to the concert that the singer Frank Sinatra did in Buenos Aires, Argentina, invited by Palito, to whom she herself gave a bouquet of roses as thanks.

Personal life 
She was married to the musician Iván Noble, ex Caballeros de la Quema, with whom she had a son named Benito Noble Ortega.

Career 
Her acting career began in Argentina having studied theater at the Actors Studio of Los Angeles, California. On television he played bold roles a lesbian along with Carolina Fal in Son o se hacen, a nurse from a psychiatric hospital in Sol negro, a prostitute in Disputas and the niece of Emilio Uriarte, in Los Roldán. In theater she was part of the cast of El cartero with texts based on the novel by Antonio Skármeta. In cinema, she starred La maestra normal, Pequeños milagros from Eliseo Subiela, 24 horas (Algo está por explotar) and participated in Animalada. In the year 2012, she is part of the cast of the successful telecomedy Graduados. In 2014 she is part of the cast of Viudas e hijos del Rock & Roll.

Filmography

Television

Movies

Television Programs

References

20th-century Argentine actresses
Julieta
Living people
1971 births
21st-century Argentine actresses
Argentine film actresses
Argentine telenovela actresses
Argentine television actresses